Wrecking Everything is a 2002 live album by thrash metal band Overkill which is the counterpart to Wrecking Everything – An Evening in Asbury Park VHS/DVD. Recorded at The Paramount, Asbury Park, New Jersey on March 23, 2002. As of 2006, the album had sold over 5,300 copies and according to Bobby "Blitz" Ellsworth, the VHS/DVD has sold around 15,000–20,000 copies in the U.S.

Track listing

Credits

Personnel
Bobby "Blitz" Ellsworth – lead vocals
D.D. Verni – bass, backing vocals
Dave Linsk – lead guitar, backing vocals
Derek Tailer – rhythm guitar, backing vocals
Tim Mallare – drums

Production
 Produced by Overkill

References

External links
 Official OVERKILL Site

Overkill (band) albums
2002 live albums
Live thrash metal albums
Albums with cover art by Travis Smith (artist)